Saed Ahmed Kubenea is a Tanzanian politician and journalist. 

He was elected MP representing Ubungo in 2015. He is also a co-owner of MwanaHalisi Publishing Media.

References 

Living people
Tanzanian politicians
Tanzanian MPs 2015–2020
Year of birth missing (living people)